Oleg Alexeyevich Bogomolov was the governor of Kurgan Oblast, Russia. He was born in Petukhovo in Kurgan Oblast on October 4, 1950. He became a member of the Kurgan Oblast Duma in 1994. He has been governor of Kurgan Oblast since 1996, being re-elected in 2000 and 2004. At December 25, 2009,  his candidacy was approved by the regional Duma for vesting the powers of the higher official of the subject of the Russian Federation for the next term, on the proposal of the President of the Russian Federation.

In 1977 — 1991 member of Communist Party of the Soviet Union. In 1995 — 1996 he is a supporter of the party . In 2000 — 2003 he is a member of President Putin's party "Union of Unity and Fatherland". From 2004 he is a member of President Putin's United Russia Party.

14 February 2014 Putin accepted his request for resignation.

Honors and awards
Order of Friendship
Order of the Badge of Honor
Medal "In Commemoration of the 850th Anniversary of Moscow"
Medal "In Commemoration of the 300th Anniversary of Saint Petersburg"
Medal "For Merit in the All-Russia Census"
Medal "For the Promotion of Rescue Matters" (EMERCOM)

References

1950 births
People from Kurgan Oblast
Living people
Governors of Kurgan Oblast
Communist Party of the Soviet Union members
United Russia politicians
21st-century Russian politicians
Members of the Federation Council of Russia (1994–1996)
Members of the Federation Council of Russia (1996–2000)